Aboubacar Dit Boubou Konté (born 2 March 2001) is a Malian footballer who plays as a forward for Norwegian club Fredrikstad.

Career
On 11 March 2019, Sarpsborg 08 announced the signing of Konté to a four-year contract.

On 27 August 2021, he joined Nacional in Portugal on loan.

Career statistics

Club

Notes

References

2001 births
Living people
Malian footballers
Malian expatriate footballers
Mali youth international footballers
Association football forwards
Eliteserien players
Norwegian First Division players
Liga Portugal 2 players
Sarpsborg 08 FF players
FC Nordsjælland players
FK Jerv players
C.D. Nacional players
Expatriate footballers in Norway
Malian expatriate sportspeople in Norway
Expatriate men's footballers in Denmark
Malian expatriate sportspeople in Denmark
Expatriate footballers in Portugal
Malian expatriate sportspeople in Portugal
21st-century Malian people